The 2023 SGB Premiership is the 88th season of the top tier of British speedway and the 6th known as the SGB Premiership.

There was an increase of one team after the Leicester Lions opted to move up from the SGB Championship.

2023 summary
Seven clubs will compete for the league championship, with Leicester Lions joining the from the division below. Each club will race against each other four times (home and away twice), meaning a total of 24 fixtures each. The 'Super Heat' scoring system was retained from the 2022 season, however extra points for away fixtures have been scrapped in favour of an aggregate bonus point.

The top four teams in the league will qualify for the playoffs, with the two semi-final winners then reaching the Grand Final. The points limit remains 39 points for six riders, with one additional 'rising star'.

League

Regular season
League table

Play offs

Home team scores are in bold
Overall aggregate scores are in red

Grand Final
First leg

Second leg

Knockout Cup
The 2023 Knockout Cup was the 78th edition of the Knockout Cup for tier one teams but the first since 2019.

Bracket

Home team scores are in bold
Overall aggregate scores are in red

Final
First leg

Second leg

Squads

Belle Vue Aces

 (C)

 (Rising Star)

Ipswich Witches

 (C)

/ Emil Sayfutdinov
 (Rising Star)

King's Lynn Stars

 (C)
 (Rising Star)

Leicester Lions

 (C)

 (Rising Star)

Peterborough Panthers

 (Rising Star)

Sheffield Tigers

 (C)

 (Rising Star)

Wolverhampton Wolves

 (C)

 (Rising Star)

See also
SGB Championship 2023
SGB National Development League 2023
British Speedway League Champions

References

SGB Premiership
SGB Premiership
SGB Premiership